Frank Fuller may refer to:
Frank Fuller (American football) (1929–1993), American football defensive tackle
Frank Fuller (baseball) (1893–1965),  backup infielder in Major League Baseball

See also
Francis Fuller (disambiguation)